Olaf Sergiusz Linde-Lubaszenko (born 6 December  1968) is a Polish actor and film director.

He was born in Wrocław, the son of Edward Linde-Lubaszenko, who is an actor of German and Swedish descent and Asja Łamtiugina, a Russian actress.

Olaf Lubaszenko starred in films by Krzysztof Kieślowski, Barbara Sass, Władysław Pasikowski, Janusz Majewski, Juliusz Machulski and others.

In 2001, he became a member of the European Film Academy.

Selected filmography

Actor 

1987: Łuk Erosa - Adam Karowski
1988: Sonata marymoncka - Rysiek Lewandowski
1988: Trójkąt bermudzki - Poker Player (uncredited)
1988: Tabu - Stefek
1988: Bez grzechu - Jarek Kalita
1988: A Short Film About Love - Tomek
1990: Pilkarski poker - Olek Grom
1989: Czarny wawóz - Ludwik Machl
1990: Marcowe migdały - Tomek
1990: Korczak - Tramwajarz
1990: Historia niemoralna - Marek
1990: Po upadku - Piotr Ratajczak, son
1991: Kroll - Marcin Kroll
1992: Odjazd - Priest
1992: Pigs - Young
1993: Pamietnik znaleziony w garbie
1993: Schindler's List - Auschwitz Guard #1
1994: Les Amoureux - Tomek
1995: Gnoje - Gasior
1996: Słodko gorzki - Mat's Brother
1996: Wirus
1996: Poznań '56 - Soldier
1997: Sztos - Mietek
1997: Kiler - Actor at Airport
1997: Zona przychodzi noca
1998: Demons of War - Lt. Czacki
1998: Sekal Has to Die - Jura Baran
1999: A Szerencse lányai - Janek
1999: Operacja Samum - Stanislaw Kosinski
1999: Moja Angelika - Kulik
1999: Kilerów 2-óch - Himself
2000: Zakochani - Prawnik
2000: Operacja Koza - Adam Horn
2000: Pierwszy milion - Priest
2000: Egoiści - Sad
2000: Bajland - Józef Horoszko
2001: Edges of the Lord - Gniecio
2001: Stacja - Commissioner Zawadzki
2002: Tam i z powrotem - Lt. Niewczas
2002: Rób swoje, ryzyko jest twoje - Emil Baks
2002: E=mc2 - Max Kadzielski
2002: Bez litosci - Olbrycht
2003: Magiczna Gwiazda - Hubert (voice)
2009: Złoty środek - Keyboarder
2009: Mniejsze zło - Civilian
2011: Weekend - Czeski
2012: Sztos 2 - Mietek
2016: Bóg w Krakowie - Homeless
2017: Gwiazdy - Czechoslovakian customs officer
2018: Women of Mafia - Commander
2022: Hellhole – Prior Andrzej

Director 

1997: Sztos
2000: Chłopaki nie płaczą
2001: Poranek Kojota
2002: E=mc2
2009: Złoty środek
2012: Sztos 2

Polish dubbing 

2003: Finding Nemo  - Gill
2004: Les Dalton (Les Dalton) - Lucky Luke
2007: Lissi und der wilde Kaiser - Yeti
2008: Beverly Hills Chihuahuas - Delgado
2013: Wreck-It Ralph - Wreck-It Ralph
2011: Beverly Hills Chihuahua - Delgado
2014: Guardians of the Galaxy - Denarian Saal
2016: Finding Dory  - Gill
2018: Ralph Breaks the Internet  - Wreck-It Ralph

References

External links 
 
 Olaf Lubaszenko Encyklopedia WIEM 

1968 births
Actors from Wrocław
Living people
Polish male film actors
Polish male television actors
Polish male voice actors
Polish film directors
Polish people of German descent
Polish people of Swedish descent
Polish people of Russian descent
Czech Lion Awards winners
Artists from Białystok